Live at the Budokan is a live album by American band Chic, released on Nile Rodgers' label Sumthing Else in 1999.

The album contains the concert at Tokyo's Budokan on April 17, 1996 that was to be the last performance by fellow Chic member Bernard Edwards who died the following day. The concert was a celebration of the Chic legacy and featured an all-star line-up with guest appearances by Sister Sledge, Slash from Guns N' Roses and Steve Winwood and was released three years after its recording, in unedited form including the spoken introductions by both Edwards and Rodgers.

The concert was released on DVD in 2006 and the Budokan album has been re-issued as Chic in Japan and Live in Japan.

Track listing
Bernard Introduction – 1:09
Band Introduction – 0:33
"Le Freak" (Bernard Edwards, Nile Rodgers) – 5:14
 Performed by Chic & Slash
"Dance Dance Dance (Yowsah, Yowsah, Yowsah)" (Intro) (Edwards, Kenny Lehman, Rodgers) – 0:31
"Dance, Dance, Dance (Yowsah, Yowsah, Yowsah)" (Edwards, Lehman, Rodgers) – 7:04
"I Want Your Love" (Edwards, Rodgers) – 6:17
Sister Sledge (Intro) – 0:12
"He's the Greatest Dancer" (Edwards, Rodgers) – 4:37
 Performed by: Chic & Sister Sledge
We Are Family (Intro) – 0:22
"We Are Family" (Edwards, Rodgers) – 10:06
 Performed by: Chic & Sister Sledge
"Do That Dance" (Garrett Oliver, Tanya Ramtulla, Rodgers) – 3:24
Good Times (Intro) – 0:15
"Good Times"/"Rapper's Delight" (Edwards, Rodgers) – 7:12
Stone Free (Intro) – 0:21
"Stone Free" (Jimi Hendrix) – 4:22
 Performed by Chic, Steve Winwood & Slash
"Chic Cheer" (Edwards, Rodgers) – 14:20
Backstage  – 0:23
Bernard #2 – 0:31

Personnel
 Sylver Logan Sharp – lead vocals
 Sister Sledge (Debbie, Joni & Kim Sledge) – lead vocals (tracks 7 to 10)
 Steve Winwood – lead vocals, organ (track 15)
 Christopher Max – backing vocals
 Jill Jones – backing vocals
 Slash – lead guitar (tracks 3 & 15)
 Nile Rodgers – guitar, vocals
 Philippe Saisse – piano
 Richard Hilton – keyboards
 Bernard Edwards – bass guitar, vocals
 Omar Hakim – drums
 Gerardo Velez – percussion
 Bill Holloman – saxophone
 Mac Gollehon – trumpet

Production
 Producer – Nile Rodgers
 Recorded & mixed by Gary Tole
 Recorded live at the Budokan and mixed at Wonder Station Studios, Tokyo, Japan
 Mastered at Sterling Sound, New York
 Mastered by George Marino

References

Chic (band) live albums
Albums produced by Nile Rodgers
1999 live albums
Albums recorded at the Nippon Budokan